The 1897 DePauw football team was an American football team that represented DePauw University in the 1897 college football season. In its second season with Arthur Hamrick as coach, the team compiled a 2–6 record, and were outscored by their opponents 70 to 23. DePauw was shut out six times and did not score a single point against a collegiate football team in six contests.  In a games against Plainfield Central Academy, a disagreement over a touchdown in the first half led to a forfeit win for DePauw.

Schedule

References

DePauw
DePauw Tigers football seasons
DePauw football